Jonathan Tan may refer to:
 Jonathan Tan (footballer)
 Jonathan Tan (politician)
 Jonathan Tan (swimmer)